Bala Bowra (also Romanized as Bālā Bowrā; also known as Sarbūrā and Sar Būrā) is a village in Khvosh Rud Rural District, Bandpey-ye Gharbi District, Babol County, Mazandaran Province, Iran. At the 2006 census, its population was 348, in 90 families.

References 

Populated places in Babol County